Hokkaido Hakodate Chubu High School (北海道函館中部高等学校, Hokkaidō Hakodate Chūbu Kōtō Gakkō) is a high school in Hakodate, Hokkaidō, Japan, founded in 1895. Hokkaido Hakodate Chubu High School is one of the high schools administered by Hokkaido.

The school is operated by the Hokkaido Prefectural Board of Education.

Notable alumni
Naoki Yamamoto (山本 直樹), manga artist 
Masahiro Kobayashi (小林 正寛), actor

External links
Official website of Hokkaido Hakodate Chubu High School

High schools in Hokkaido
Educational institutions established in 1895
1895 establishments in Japan